Ancuabe District is a district of Cabo Delgado Province in northern Mozambique. It covers 4,984 km2 with 199,457 inhabitants in 2015. Its seat is the town of Ancuabe.

Geography
It borders to the north with the district of Meluco, west with the district of Montepuez, south of the district of Chiúre and that the districts of Pemba-Metuge and Quissanga.

Demographics
According to the 1997 census, the district had 87,243 inhabitants. Government data in early 2005 revealed a population of 109,792 n an area of 4 836 km2, resulting in a population density of 21.9 persons per km2. The same source points to a population of 121,000 inhabitants in 2015.

The district is inhabited mostly by the Makua people.

History
In colonial period, Ancuabe was an administrative post in the municipality of Porto Amelia (now Pemba)

Administrative divisions

The district is divided into three administrative sub districts (posts) (Ancuabe, Metoro and
Meza, comprise the following locations:

 Administrative Post Ancuabe:
 Ancuabe
 Chiote
 Nacuale
 Administrative Post Metoro:
 Metoro
 Salave
 Administrative Post Meza:
 Campine
 Meza
 Minhuene
 Nanju

Towns and villages
Adamo  Alenane Alimo Aliti Alumar Amade Amade Ametina Aneli Anli Apura Arufo Assane Assane Assane Atoto Bacar Bacar Antigo Banjira Biaque Bidjolo Borolia Camope Cantalia Cantia Cauo Cavano Chefe Afonso Chefe Ahonamoro Chefe Antonio Chefe Aquimo Chefe Cahura Chefe Caire Chefe Calialia Chefe Cantato Chefe Caroa Chefe Chinande Chefe Cobre Chefe Colete Chefe Coze Chefe Cunliala Chefe Giquina Chefe Iacuelane Chefe Ingori Chefe Inhatia Chefe Inripa Chefe Inteia Chefe Jalipa Chefe Julai Chefe Lave Chefe Lile Chefe Lopa Chefe Madondo Chefe Malepela Chefe Marraca Chefe Misere Chefe Muanenele Chefe Muansava Chefe Muatuca Chefe Muisse Chefe Muituva Chefe Nacibo Chefe Naioto Chefe Namione Chefe Nampuara Chefe Nancuto Chefe Nanhoma Chefe N Cumabai Chefe Necule Chefe Neparula Chefe Nicuto Chefe Nigoeleua Chefe Nivero Chefe Pilote Chefe Puelia Chefe Purremuere Chefe Purulia Chefe Quilevele Chefe Quimao Chefe Quitarubo Chefe Raide Chefe Sabao Chefe Sararia Chefe Sehane Chefe Selemane Chefe Sucuma Chefe Taiar Chefe Tico Chitima Chiure Colue Comala Costa Covaninha Cuvave Daxe Dhalman Giole Givarro Iamorra Incole Ingaua Inraba Insania Iupuro Jipala João Joio Juma Langima Limia Maaje Macaia Macaiamo Macassar Machepe Macota Magengo Maite Malapua Manocha Maon-o Mapia Marraparre Mataiolava Mauala Mbonge Mecete Mecueracuera Megama Megege Meia Mejacara Menhula Mepamei Mepengula Mepipo Mepoto Mequitaculo Merrapia Mesa Messalo Messiloca Metania Metito Metoma Metoro Metorro Metuaquene Meurra Mexilo Minhoene Mocoloje Mogido Moguia Moja Moloco Monunene Moquina Morruma Mpingo Mpita Muada Muaja Muaja Mualania Muania Muaria Mue Muepurra Mueraerie Muero Muerria Mugara Muguia Muguia Muicava Muigima Muipace Muiquite Muita Mussa Nacacane Nacololo Nacopa Nacote Nacuale Nacuale Nacuanha Nacuchupa Nacussa Nagimbue Naia Nalapia Nalile Namaaquitica Namachatua Namaica Namangoma Namarraco Namarro Namatubile Namatuca Namauco Namuela Namuela Namecala NametaNampacala Nampita Namuine NancoiNancuto Nanduli Nangana Nanjua Nanlia Nanoa Nanripo Nantoa Nantucia Nanzarro Naoia Naputa Narenga Narreva Ncole Ndala Nero Ngeue Ngura Niare Nicocoro Nicorombe Nicuata Niico Nimone Nina Nipatacua Niqueque Niquita Nita Nivico Nomapa Nonia Ntete Nucuncile Nuico Nuto Olocota Omar Regulo Mariri Regulo MedomaRegulo Mepima Regulo Mogabo Regulo Momola Regulo Namaluma Regulo Polubo Regulo Polupo Reia Retima Reva Rimo Roja Rupe Sabai Saide Sicoto Simbo Sirico Sitaa Sunate Talibo Talique TapararaTarade Tarato Tecua Terruma Teucha Titimare Tonhinto TuculeUadjireUapila Uarrussa Uatuncorra Zambezia

Economy

The district is well served in terms of accessibility, as it is cut by two major roads, Pemba-Montepuez and north-south road that connects Nampula to Mocímboa da Praia. The town of Ancuabe is located 67 kilometres from Pemba.

The dominant economic activity in the district is agriculture, involving almost the entire population. Most agricultural production is for self-support and the main crops are: cassava, maize, bean, sorghum, peanut and rice. Food supply is also aided with domestic animals and hunting of wildlife (deer and wild boar), and the fruit harvest.

Commercial farming of cotton, brown nuts and maize were important in colonial times and post-colonial but are returning, especially the cotton industry is of note. They are also exploited forest resources, especially as energy source for most of the population, although there is great potential forest.

There are also large reserves of graphite which were exploited commercially from 1994 to 2000.
Graphites de Ancuabe Ltda. operated a sizeable mine and plant near Ancuabe from 1994 to 1999. According to feasibility studies for international mining companies, the reserves amount to about 1 million tonnes of ore with a content of 10% graphite. The extraction capacity installed (open) has a potential production capacity of 10,000 tons of graphite a year. The extraction and processing were stalled in 1999, however, due to a number of reasons, particularly financial difficulties of the dealer, the low price of the mineral on the international market and a poor and expensive power supply, because the district is not yet connected to the national grid. In 2007, the Mozambique government announced its intention to re-open the mine, but this depends on the supply of electricity from the Cahora Bassa Dam.

References

External links
Government profile 
 
 
Districts in Cabo Delgado Province